The Dominican Summer Pirates 2 or DSL Pirates 2 was briefly the second Dominican Summer League team affiliated with the Pittsburgh Pirates and were based in Boca Chica, Dominican Republic from 2012 to 2013.

History
However the team was previously known as the Venezuelan Summer Pirates or VSL Pirates and were a part of the Venezuelan Summer League, from 2004 until 2011. During that time, team was affiliated with the Pirates and based in San Joaquín, Carabobo, Venezuela. The team has won 5 straight league regular season titles over the span of 2006 to 2010.  They have also won league championship titles in 2008 and 2010.

On September 12, 2011, the Pirates announced that the organization would be terminating its lease and no longer participating in the six-team Venezuelan Summer League. The instability and political climate in Venezuela is thought to have played a large role in the organization's decision to pull out of the league. The decision led to the Pirates fielding two teams in the Dominican Summer League, with the remnants of the VSL Pirates forming the Dominican Summer Pirates 2. Both clubs will accommodate 35 players, meaning that the closure of the Venezuelan academy will not impact the number of players the Pirates can develop in Latin America.

The DSL Pirates 2 posted a 34-34 record in their first season. During their 2013 season the team posted a 46-26 record, but were eliminated in the first round of the playoff by the DSL Tigers. They Pirates returned to one DSL team in 2014.

Season-by-season record

2013 Roster

References

External links
 MiLB.com team page
 Baseball Reference team page

Dominican Summer League teams
Pittsburgh Pirates minor league affiliates
Baseball teams established in 2004
Baseball teams disestablished in 2013